Park Holidays UK operates 54 holiday parks in the UK and is one of the largest holiday park operators in the UK, offering caravan and lodge holidays, glamping breaks, touring and camping, and holiday home ownership. It has parks in both country and coastal locations. The company is a member of the British Holiday and Home Parks Association (BH&HPA).

In 2015 and 2022, Park Holidays UK was awarded the "Investors In People - Silver Award" for good staff and recruitment practices. In early 2021, for the fifth year in a row, global ratings and reviews provider Feefo awarded Park Holidays UK the Gold Service Award.

History

The company was founded in the mid-1980s and was originally called Cinque Ports Leisure. Frenchmans Beach, renamed Rye Harbour, was the first park to be owned, and as the company expanded to include other Kent and East Sussex parks, the name Cinque Ports Leisure was introduced to emphasize the regional base; the name being associated with the port towns that helped defend the UK during the Napoleonic wars.

The company significantly expanded in 2001 with the purchase of ten parks from Haven Holidays, which extended the company's presence west into Dorset and Hampshire and north into Essex and Suffolk. It has continued to expand over the intervening years with significant park acquisitions.

In 2006, the business was acquired by Graphite Capital, and changed its name to Park Holidays UK in 2007, to reflect its expansion away from the Kent and East Sussex area, and the growing holiday and short break aspect of the business.

In 2008, the company acquired two new holiday parks in Dawlish Warren, Devon: Golden Sands Holiday Park and Peppermint Holiday Park. These were later amalgamated in 2013 into a single park location.

In November 2013, Caledonia Investments became the owners which facilitated continued investment and further acquisitions.

In December 2015, Park Holidays UK relocated its head office from Coghurst Hall, Hastings, to Glovers House, Bexhill-on-Sea with approximately 90 staff members, the first development to be completed in the newly built Bexhill Enterprise Park. Keeping with the company’s growing ambition Glovers House is a modern, low-energy building with panoramic views over the surrounding Sussex countryside, housing a three-floor, 25,235-square-foot set of offices. 
In December 2016 it was announced that Caledonia Investments had agreed on terms for a sale to Tiger Bidco Ltd, a company incorporated by Intermediate Capital Group (ICG).

Other park locations have been added to the company over the years. Broadland Sands Holiday Park in Suffolk was completed in December 2014, followed by Two Chimneys Holiday Park in 2015, which was renamed Birchington Vale, to reflect its location in the tranquil North Kent countryside. Tarka Holiday Park near Barnstaple, North Devon was added in April 2016.

In June 2017, Park Holidays UK purchased Carlton Meres in Suffolk, just ten miles inland from the picturesque seaside town of Aldeburgh. In August 2017, the company bought Martello Beach Holiday Park (renamed as Pevensey Bay Holiday Park) near Eastbourne, East Sussex. In May 2018 they purchased another park named Martello Beach Holiday Park (keeping the original name) which is next to their St Osyth Beach resort, and then, in December 2018, the company purchased Dovercourt Holiday Park in Essex. In November 2019 they acquired a park on Mersea Island (Seaview Holiday Park), renaming it West Mersea Holiday Park. Wood Farm in Dorset and Pakefield Holiday Park in Suffolk were added in December 2020, bringing the total number of holiday parks to 33.

In April 2021, Park Holidays UK acquired a group of nine-holiday parks from Bridge Leisure, with parks located in the West Country, Peak District, Yorkshire and Scotland.

In April 2022 an agreement was reached with Sun Communities to acquire Park Holidays UK from ICG (intermediate Capital Group). Sun Communities is a publicly listed organisation and the largest operator of leisure and manufactured home communities in the USA.

Later that April Park Holidays UK acquired Waterside Cornwall Holiday Park renaming it Bodmin Holiday Park to better reflect its location – which brings the total number of holiday parks to 54.

Over the last 5–10 years Park Holidays UK have carried out major refurbishments to its holiday parks, in particular, focusing on infrastructure, clubhouses, new swimming pools, additional facilities, and upgraded holiday accommodation, with a strong focus on developments for luxury lodges.

On 23 June 2022 Sun Communities Inc acquired Park Leisure 2000 Ltd and announced that the latter would trade alongside Park holidays UK as a sister company, and would be defined by a more boutique holiday park feel. The purchase includes the takeover of 11 holiday parks owned by Park Leisure across destinations in England, Scotland and North Wales.

Locations
Park Holidays UK operates 4 parks in Cornwall (Hengar Manor, Trevella, Bodmin and Polperro), 7 parks in Devon (Riviera Bay, Landscove, Waterside, Dawlish Sands, Golden Sands, Tarka and Hedley Wood), 2 in Dorset (Sandhills and Wood Farm), 1 in Hampshire (Solent Breezes), 6 in Sussex (Beauport, Coghurst Hall, Chichester Lakeside, Winchelsea Sands, Rye Harbour Holiday Park, Pevensey Bay), 6 in Kent (Marlie, New Beach, Alberta, Seaview, Harts, Birchington Vale), 7 in Essex (Steeple Bay, Oaklands, Seawick, St Osyth Beach, Martello Beach, Dovercourt, West Mersea) and 5 in Suffolk (Felixstowe Beach, Suffolk Sands, Broadland Sands, Carlton Meres and Pakefield), 1 in Derbyshire (Ashbourne Heights), 2 in Yorkshire (Bowland Fell and Sand Le Mere), and 4 in Scotland (Silver Sands and Turnberry). There are two separate park locations operating under Silver Sands - Lossiemouth and Burghead.

Park Leisure operates 3 parks in Cornwall (Oyster Bay, Par Sands and Pentire), 1 park in Herefordshire (Malvern View), 1 park in Lancashire (Ribble Valley), 2 parks in North Wales (Brynteg and Plas Coch), 1 park in Northumberland (Amble Links) and 3 parks in Yorkshire (Chantry, Littondale and Yorkshire Dales).

References

External links
http://www.parkholidays.com
http://www.parkleisure.com

Travel and holiday companies of the United Kingdom